Miłosław  is a town in Września County, Greater Poland Voivodeship, Poland, with 3,627 inhabitants.

A battle between Polish insurgents and Prussian forces took place there during the Greater Poland Uprising of 1848 in the Prussian Partition of Poland.

Sights
The landmarks of Miłosław include the Church of Saint James from 1620, the palace of the Mielżyński and Kościelski noble families with an adjacent park, the monument to the Polish insurgents fallen in the Battle of Miłosław in 1848, and the oldest monument of Polish national poet Juliusz Słowacki, unveiled in 1899.

Gallery

References 

Cities and towns in Greater Poland Voivodeship
Gmina Miłosław